Boko is a district in the Pool Department of south-eastern Republic of the Congo. It has the same name as its capital, the town of Boko.

Towns and villages

See also
Boko-Songho District
Boko (Burkina Faso)

References

Pool Department
Districts of the Republic of the Congo